Diersbach is a municipality in the district of Schärding in the Austrian state of Upper Austria.

Geography
Diersbach lies in the Innviertel. About 13 percent of the municipality is forest, and 78 percent is farmland.

References

Sauwald
Cities and towns in Schärding District